Luis María "Koldo" Aguirre Vidaurrázaga (27 April 1939 – 3 July 2019) was a Spanish football midfielder and manager.

He played for Athletic Bilbao for twelve years, appearing in 297 competitive matches (61 goals scored) and winning two Copa del Rey trophies.

Playing career

Club
Born in Sondika, Biscay, Aguirre joined Athletic Bilbao in 1957 at the age of 18 from Basque neighbours CD Getxo, being immediately promoted to the first team. He made his La Liga debut on 19 January 1958 in a 2–1 away loss against Real Zaragoza, and finished his first season with only three matches played; the campaign ended with Copa del Generalísimo conquest.

In the following years, Aguirre was a regular starter for Athletic, scoring a career-best 11 goals in 29 games in 1961–62 to help the side finish in fifth position. On 10 October 1965 he put four past RCD Español in a 4–3 away win in 11 minutes, as the opposition's goalkeeper was former teammate and good friend Carmelo Cedrún. Towards the end of his spell with the Lions, when he was again only a fringe player, he won his second domestic cup, against Elche CF.

In the summer of 1969, aged 30, Aguirre transferred to fellow league club CE Sabadell FC, retiring halfway through the season after only 115 minutes of action in order support his family in the wake of the death of his younger brother Iñaki (a goalkeeper with AD Plus Ultra) from leukaemia. He still played some amateur football with Alicante CF, and later worked with Athletic Bilbao as an ambassador with the supporters.

International
Aguirre earned seven caps for Spain, in four years. His debut was on 19 April 1961, in a 2–1 away win against Wales for the 1962 FIFA World Cup qualifiers.

Coaching career
Aguirre began his coaching career in the lower divisions. He returned to his main club Athletic Bilbao as an assistant manager, after having been in charge of the reserves and also of neighbouring Deportivo Alavés; he was promoted to head coach for 1976–77 and, during his three-year spell, the team finished twice in third position, reaching the finals of the Spanish Cup and the UEFA Cup in 1977.

Aguirre then worked three seasons with Hércules CF – also in the top flight – being relegated in his last year, 1981–82. In the following campaign he was one of three managers at Valencia CF, being in charge for the final seven games (three wins, two draws and two losses) as they ranked in 15th, the first position above the relegation zone; crucially, they defeated leaders Real Madrid on the final matchday, which meant not only that they stayed up but also that Athletic won the title, his former club having reciprocated the favour to Valencia by beating UD Las Palmas who finished 16th and went down.

After another brief spell in the top division, with RCD Mallorca, Aguirre returned to the lower leagues, and again managed Bilbao Athletic amongst other sides.

Death
Aguirre died in Bilbao on 3 July 2019, at the age of 80.

Honours

Player
Athletic Bilbao
Copa del Rey: 1958, 1969; Runner-up 1965–66, 1966–67

Manager
Athletic Bilbao
Copa del Rey runner-up: 1976–77
UEFA Cup runner-up: 1976–77

References

External links
 
 
 
 Athletic Bilbao manager profile
 
 
 

1939 births
2019 deaths
People from Greater Bilbao
Sportspeople from Biscay
Spanish footballers
Footballers from the Basque Country (autonomous community)
Association football midfielders
La Liga players
CD Getxo players
Athletic Bilbao footballers
CE Sabadell FC footballers
Alicante CF footballers
Spain B international footballers
Spain international footballers
Spanish football managers
La Liga managers
Segunda División managers
Segunda División B managers
Deportivo Alavés managers
Athletic Bilbao B managers
Athletic Bilbao managers
Hércules CF managers
Valencia CF managers
RCD Mallorca managers
CD Logroñés managers
UE Lleida managers
Barakaldo CF managers